is The Brilliant Green's eleventh single, released in 2000. It peaked at #3 on the Oricon singles chart.

Track listing

References

2000 singles
The Brilliant Green songs
Songs written by Tomoko Kawase
Songs written by Shunsaku Okuda
Japanese television drama theme songs
2000 songs